Chicoreus corrugatus is a species of sea snail, a marine gastropod mollusk in the family Muricidae, the murex snails or rock snails.

Description
 Size 3–5 cm (30-50mm)

Distribution
 Red Sea

References

Muricidae
Gastropods described in 1841